The Bunker Game is a 2022 French-Italian horror film directed by Roberto Zazzara, starring Gaia Weiss, Lorenzo Richelmy, Mark Ryder, Amina Ben Ismaïl, Tudor Istodor and .

Cast
 Gaia Weiss as Laura
 Lorenzo Richelmy as Gregorio
 Mark Ryder as Harry
 Amina Ben Ismaïl as Yasmine
 Tudor Istodor as Andrej
  as Marcus
 Felice Jankell as Robin
 Serena de Ferrari as Clara
 Léa Rostain as Jenny
 Nicolo Pasetti as Kurt

Release
The film was released on Shudder on 17 March 2022.

Reception
Matt Donato of Paste gave the film a rating of 5.5/10 and wrote that there it has "few screams outside predictable jump scares" and is "slack in suspense".  rated the film 2 stars out of 5.

Ian Sedensky of Culture Crypt gave the film a score of 45 out of 100 and wrote that at its best it "might be considered a decent thriller among mid to low-level horror titles", but at its worst it "foolishly punts away its most interesting aspects for unknown reasons only the filmmakers could explain." Sean Parker of Horror Obsessive called the film "poorly paced and wildly unconcise" and a "waste of potential".

References

External links
 
 

French horror films
Italian horror films
2022 horror films
Films set in bunkers